Andreas Kirchner (17 August 1953 – 10 November 2010) was an East German hammer thrower and  bob pusher for record holder Wolfgang Hoppe.

He competed in the late 1970s and early 1980s. Competing in two Winter Olympics, he won two medals in the four-man with a gold in 1984 and a bronze in 1980. He was born in Erlbach-Kirchberg, Saxony.

Kirchner also won two medals in the two-man event at the FIBT World Championships with a silver in 1981 and a bronze in 1982.

On 15 November 2010 he was found dead in his apartment in Suhl, Thuringia where he worked as a teacher. He was 57.

References

External links
 Bobsleigh four-man Olympic medalists for 1924, 1932–56, and since 1964
 Bobsleigh two-man world championship medalists since 1931
 

1953 births
2010 deaths
German male hammer throwers
German male bobsledders
Bobsledders at the 1980 Winter Olympics
Bobsledders at the 1984 Winter Olympics
Olympic bobsledders of East Germany
Olympic gold medalists for East Germany
Olympic bronze medalists for East Germany
Olympic medalists in bobsleigh
National People's Army military athletes
Medalists at the 1984 Winter Olympics
Medalists at the 1980 Winter Olympics
East German male hammer throwers